Madi Queta (born 21 October 1998) is a Bissau-Guinean professional footballer who plays for Portuguese club Vilafranquense and the Guinea-Bissau national team as a winger.

Club career
On 19 August 2017, Queta made his professional debut with FC Porto B in a 2017–18 LigaPro match against Penafiel. In June 2022 he joined Bulgarian First League club Cherno More Varna. In January 2023, Queta returned to Portugal, signing a contract with second tier team Vilafranquense.

International career
Born in Guinea-Bissau, and raised in Portugal, Queta is a former youth international for Portugal. He debuted with the Guinea-Bissau national team in a friendly 3–0 win over Equatorial Guinea on 23 March 2022.

References

External links

 

1998 births
Sportspeople from Bissau
Portuguese sportspeople of Bissau-Guinean descent
Naturalised citizens of Portugal
Bissau-Guinean emigrants to Portugal
Living people
Bissau-Guinean footballers
Guinea-Bissau international footballers
Portuguese footballers
Portugal youth international footballers
Association football wingers
FC Porto B players
S.C. Farense players
PFC Cherno More Varna players
U.D. Vilafranquense players
Primeira Liga players
Liga Portugal 2 players
First Professional Football League (Bulgaria) players
Bissau-Guinean expatriate footballers
Expatriate footballers in Bulgaria
Bissau-Guinean expatriate sportspeople in Bulgaria